Mundat is an Afro-Asiatic language spoken in Plateau State, Nigeria in Mundat village of Bokkos LGA.

Notes

West Chadic languages
Languages of Nigeria